The 1973 Maryland Terrapins football team represented the University of Maryland in the 1973 NCAA Division I football season. In their second season under head coach Jerry Claiborne, the Terrapins compiled an 8–4 record (5–1 in conference), finished in second place in the Atlantic Coast Conference, and outscored their opponents 335 to 141. The team ended its season with a 17–16 loss to Georgia in the 1973 Peach Bowl. The team's statistical leaders included Al Neville with 554 passing yards, Louis Carter with 801 rushing yards, and Frank Russell with 468 receiving yards.

Schedule

Roster

References

Maryland
Maryland Terrapins football seasons
Maryland Terrapins football